Wat Buppharam (also called as the Buppharam Buddhist Temple) is a Thai temple in Pulau Tikus suburb of George Town, Penang, Malaysia. Situated at Jalan Perak, the temple is the home to a renowned statue of Buddha, the "Lifting Buddha". The temple became a focal point for the annual Siamese Songkran and Loi Krathong festivals within the city suburb and for the city yearly Buddha Day procession as well the Jathukarm-Ramathep-Ganesha blessing ceremonies.

History 
The temple was built during the Japanese occupation of British Malaya in 1942 by Phra Phothan Srikheaw, a Thai monk who became the temple's first abbot.

Features 
The temple is renowned for a century-old Buddha statue nicknamed the "Lifting Buddha". Urban legend has it that the statue contains the ability to predict whether a devotee's wishes can be fulfilled. If the statue can be lifted the first time the devotee concentrates on his or her wishes, and subsequently becomes too heavy to lift the second time, then the devotee's wish is indeed attainable. Although founded as a Theravāda Buddhist temple with the layout of Thai tradition, the temple are decorated with various mythical religious creatures of Nāgas with the mixture of Hindu and Taoist deities such as the statue of Ganesha which is placed at the main entrance while in the left located a shrine specifically for Guan Yin. On the far side leading to the burial grounds, there is a small shrine to Tudigong (Goddess of Land). In spite of the temple complex modest size, it has arguably one of the largest arches in the state.

References 

Religious buildings and structures completed in 1942
Chinese-Malaysian culture
Indian-Malaysian culture
Buddhist temples in Malaysia
Religious buildings and structures in Penang
Tourist attractions in George Town, Penang
Ganesha temples
Guanyin temples
Overseas Thai Buddhist temples
Thai Theravada Buddhist temples and monasteries
20th-century Buddhist temples
1942 establishments in the Japanese colonial empire